Jinx is the twelfth album and the ninth studio album by the Irish musician Rory Gallagher. In 2000 it was remastered with different track order and bonus tracks. The length of some songs is also different from the LP.

Track listing
All tracks composed by Rory Gallagher except where indicated.

LP
Side one
"Signals" – 4:31
"The Devil Made Me Do It" – 2:54
"Double Vision" – 4:48
"Easy Come, Easy Go" – 5:07
"Big Guns" – 3:25
Side two
"Jinxed" – 5:10
"Bourbon" – 3:54
"Ride On Red, Ride On" – 4:17 (Henry Glover, Morris Levy, Teddy Reig)
"Loose Talk" – 3:50

Original CD
"Big Guns" – 3:28
"Bourbon" – 3:54
"Double Vision" – 4:51
"The Devil Made Me Do It" – 2:54
"Hell Cat" (bonus track) – 5:04
"Signals" – 4:37
"Jinxed" – 5:11
"Easy Come, Easy Go" – 5:07
"Ride On Red, Ride On" – 4:19 (Henry Glover, Morris Levy, Teddy Reig)
"Loose Talk" – 3:52

2000 remastered CD
"Big Guns" – 3:30
"Bourbon" – 4:03
"Double Vision" – 5:04
"The Devil Made Me Do It" – 2:52
"Signals" – 4:42
"Jinxed" – 5:00
"Easy Come, Easy Go" – 5:45
"Nothin' But The Devil" (bonus track) – 3:08 (Gerry West)
"Ride On Red, Ride On" – 4:32 (Henry Glover, Morris Levy, Teddy Reig)
"Lonely Mile" (bonus track) – 4:37
"Loose Talk" – 4:08

Personnel
Rory Gallagher – vocals, guitar, harmonica
Gerry McAvoy – bass guitar
Brendan O'Neill – drums, percussion
with:
Bob Andrews – keyboards
Ray Beavis and Dick Parry – saxophone

References

External links
 Rory Gallagher's official site

1982 albums
Rory Gallagher albums
Albums produced by Rory Gallagher
Chrysalis Records albums